The Budapest–Belgrade railway connects the capital cities of Hungary and Serbia – the Budapest Keleti railway station with the new Belgrade Centre railway station.

Route, geography and landscapes 

The railway line between Budapest and Belgrade passes mainly the Bács-Kiskun County and the Serbian province of Vojvodina.

Track condition, modernization 
The outdated railway between Belgrade and Budapest will be modernised. When the project is complete, the journey between Budapest and Belgrade will be reduced to 2h 40min.
According to the plans, the track should be modernised by late 2024.

Modernization of the Hungarian section 
The Hungarian section of the project was announced in 2015 to cost HUF 472 billion and expected to be completed as of 2017–2018. Currently it is expected to cost HUF 949 billion ($3.6 billion) with interest.

In Hungary, the project is carried out by Kínai-Magyar Vasúti Nonprofit Zrt (Chinese-Hungarian Railway Nonprofit Ltd.), a Hungarian-Chinese joint venture of MÁV Zrt. with China Railway International Corporation (CRIC) and China Railway International Group (CRIG). According to one estimate, the works on this section could begin in 2021, as one year is needed for the public procurement procedures, and two years for the planning and negotiation phase.
The investment is widely criticised as it will never recover its costs.

The construction of the Hungarian part of the railway, 152 km, was started in October 2021 and is due to be completed by 2025.

Modernization of the Serbian section 
In Serbia (some ), one of the segments, the -long section Belgrade-Stara Pazova is currently being reconstructed by China Communications Construction Company (CCCC) together with China Railways International (CRI), with the investment of $350.1 million, funded with a loan from the Export-Import Bank of China. The section Stara Pazova–Novi Sad was reconstructed by the Russian RZD International, financed with Russian credit. The reconstruction of the section Novi Sad–Subotica is set to begin in 2022, with estimated cost of  €943 million, built by CCCC and a duration of 33 months, during which this section will be closed.

The construction of the railway line in Serbia started in September 2017, when the construction of the Čortanovci tunnel began. The 75 km railway for speed up to 200 km/h between Belgrade and Novi Sad opened on 19 March 2022 (this part was divided in two sections: as of 2018, the Belgrade–Stara Pazova 34.5 km section was planned to be finished in the end of 2020 and the Stara Pazova–Novi Sad 40.4 km section in November 2021). The construction of the 107.4 km section between Novi Sad and Subotica (Hungarian border) was started on 7 April 2022 and is due to be completed for the end of 2024.

Bids
Only two consortia bid for the work. The winning consortium was announced June 2019. As with most public works since 2015 the government linked Hungarian entrepreneur, Lőrinc Mészáros won, with his company “RM International Zrt”, along with two Chinese companies: China Tiejiuju Engineering & Construction LLC., and China Railway Electrification Engineering Group(Hungary) Ltd.

Reception 
Allthough the section between Budapest and Belgrade allows a four hours reduction in travel time, any further travel such as to the port of Piraeus is still 4 to 8 days away by train from Belgrade.

While the Hungarian government classified its analysis for the economic viability of the project for 10 years, estimates in the non-government-owned media estimate the return around 130 to 2400 years based on the current and expected traffic on the line.

History 

The railway line between Budapest and Belgrade was used also by the Orient Express until 1914. The Orient Express was launched on 5 June 1883. It connected Paris and Constantinople (later renamed Istanbul).

See also 
 Budapest–Belgrade–Skopje–Athens railway
 Trans-European Transport Networks (TEN-T)

References 

International railway lines
Railway lines in Hungary
Railway lines in Serbia
Proposed transport infrastructure in Hungary
Proposed transport infrastructure in Serbia